Dalisay means "pure" in the Filipino language. It is also a type of traditional Filipino liquor made from palm sap in the Visayas Islands. It can refer to:

Dalisay de nipa, or laksoy, made from nipa palm sap; also known simply as "dalisay"
Dalisay de coco, or lambanog, made from coconut palm sap
Dalisay, a Philippine film of 1939

See also
Dalisay (surname)